is a prefectural museum in Fukui, Japan, dedicated to the history and culture of Fukui Prefecture. The museum opened in 1984 and reopened after refurbishment in 2003.

See also
 Wakasa Province
 Echizen Province
 List of Historic Sites of Japan (Fukui)
 Fukui Fine Arts Museum

References

External links
  Fukui Prefectural Museum of Cultural History

Museums in Fukui Prefecture
Fukui (city)
History museums in Japan
Prefectural museums
Museums established in 1984
1984 establishments in Japan